Give 'Em All a Big Fat Lip is the debut album from The Whigs. It was originally released independently and re-released by ATO Records after they signed the group.

Track listing
"Nothing is Easy" – 4:02
"Can't Hear You Coming" – 2:13
"Technology" – 3:42
"Written Invitation" – 2:32
"Don't Talk Anymore" – 2:46
"Violet Furs" – 3:33
"Half the World Away" – 4:46
"O.K., Alright" – 3:28
"Say Hello" – 5:30
"Give 'Em All A Big Fat Lip" – 3:27
"All My Banks" – 6:58

Performers
Parker Gispert – guitar, lead vocals
Hank Sullivant – bass guitar, vocals
Julian Dorio – drums

The Whigs (band) albums
2005 albums